Foolish Behaviour  is Rod Stewart's tenth studio album, released on 21 November 1980 on the Riva label in the United Kingdom (RVLP 11) and on Warner Bros. Records in both The United States (HS 3485) and Germany (WB 56 865).  The tracks were recorded at The Record Plant Studios and Cherokee Studios in Los Angeles from February to September 1980. "Passion", "My Girl", "Somebody Special", "Oh God, I Wish I Was Home Tonight" and "Gi' Me Wings" were released as singles.

The video to another song on the album, "She Won't Dance With Me", was the third video to be played on MTV when it launched 1 August 1981. The lyrics contain the use of the word "fuck" which remained unedited in the video.

Track listing 
All tracks written by Rod Stewart, Phil Chen, Kevin Savigar, Jim Cregan and Gary Grainger; except where noted.

Side one
"Better off Dead" (Stewart, Chen, Savigar, Carmine Appice) – 3:07
"Passion" – 5:29
"Foolish Behaviour" – 4:24
"So Soon We Change" – 3:44
"Oh God, I Wish I Was Home Tonight"  – 5:02

Side two
"Gi' Me Wings" – 3:47
"My Girl" (Stewart, Chen, Savigar, Cregan, Grainger, Appice) – 4:27
"She Won’t Dance with Me" (Stewart, Jorge Ben) – 2:30
"Somebody Special" (Stewart, Steve Harley, Chen, Savigar, Cregan, Grainger) – 4:29
"Say It Ain’t True" – 4:02

German cassette release bonus track
"I Just Wanna Make Love to You" (Live) (Willie Dixon)

"Passion" was also released as a promo 12" single with a track length of 7:30. This extended version was also a bonus track on the US 8-track and US cassette releases.

Personnel
Rod Stewart – vocals, harmonica
Jim Cregan  (A 5 all guitars ), Gary Grainger (Dobro A 3 ), Billy Peek  (A 1, B 3) – guitar
Phil Chen, Tim Bogert (B 1 - B 3), James Haslip (A 5) – bass guitar
Carmine Appice – drums, timpani 
Colin Allen (A 5, B 4, B 5), Roger Bethelmy (A 4) – drums
Kevin Savigar, John Jarvis – keyboards
Paulinho Da Costa – percussion
Phil Kenzie, Earl Price, James Gordon – saxophone
Billy Lamb, Jim Price – trombone
Lee Thornburg – trumpet
Sid Page – violin
Susan Grindell, Valerie Carter, Dianne Steinberg, Dee Archer, Tony Brock, The Rod Stewart Group – backing vocals
Del Newman – string arrangements
Technical
Rick Charles Delena – second engineer
Mixed by Jeremy Andrew Johns and the Somerset Segovia
Karat Faye – engineer

Charts

Certifications

References

External links
 ABOUT ROD – Discography: Foolish Behaviour

Rod Stewart albums
1980 albums
Albums produced by Tom Dowd
Albums produced by Andy Johns
Riva Records albums
Warner Records albums